Hand of Fire is an American thrash metal band that originated in California. The band started in 2015 as a vision of frontman, Jim Settle, formerly of Tantrum of the Muse.

Background 
In 2010, Hand of Fire formed with Jim Settle (formerly of Tantrum of the Muse) and Corey Steger (formerly of Underoath) as just a project. The project started to write music and record. The original band was Settle, Steger. Rottweiler Records heard the music and sent the project a contract. Due to the distance between the members, Steger left the band, while Settle organised an official lineup, all members from his project Bore. In 2015, the band officially started as a vision of Settle's. In May 2016, Hand of Fire signed to Rottweiler Records. The band consists of vocalist Jim Settle, guitarist Tiago Souza, bassist Tom Eaton, and drummer Bill Davies. The band's debut album, Let the Killings Begin is due to be released through Rottweiler in 2016. Later it was announced the album would be released on December 3, 2016. The band later released a lyric video for "Let the Killings Begin" of the album. The album, titled Nuclear Sunrise, was released on November 17, 2017 and received great reviews.

On August 24, 2018, the band announced that their newest track, "World of Deception" would air on Reanimated Radio. The track released the night, via The Covenant Metal Show through Reanimated Radio. On March 10, 2019, it was officially announced that Tom Eaton, who had previously announced his departure, and Bill Davies has departed from the band and were replaced by Greg Christian (ex-Testament) and Jason Borton (Jungle Rot, Kataklysm) respectively. However, by March 2020, Borton and Christian were no longer a part of the band, and were replaced by a returning Davies and new member Marcel Eaton, formerly of Trauma. On March 17, 2021, founder and former member Corey Steger passed away due to a car accident.

Members 

Timeline

Discography 
Demo
 Let the Killings Begin (2016)

Studio albums
 Nuclear Sunrise (2017)
 World of Deception (TBA)

Singles
 "Let the Killings Begin" (2016)
 "Deck the Angels" (2016)
 "The Prophecy" (2017)
 "World of Deception" (2018)

Compilation appearances
 The Bearded Dragon's Sampler: Third Times a Charm (2017; The Bearded Dragon Productions)
 The Pack Vol. 1 (2017; Rottweiler)

References 

Musical groups established in 2015
Thrash metal musical groups from California
Rottweiler Records artists
2015 establishments in California